Oleg Aleksandrovich Leonov (born 24 August 2001) is a Russian football player. He plays for FC Nosta Novotroitsk.

Club career
He made his debut in the Russian Football National League for FC Tom Tomsk on 3 November 2019 in a game against FC Luch Vladivostok.

References

External links
 
 Profile by Russian Football National League

2001 births
Sportspeople from Tomsk
Living people
Russian footballers
Association football midfielders
FC Tom Tomsk players
FC Nosta Novotroitsk players
Russian First League players
Russian Second League players